The Paradise Combined Cycle Plant (formerly known as Paradise Fossil Plant) is a natural gas power plant operated by the Tennessee Valley Authority (TVA). Located just east of Drakesboro, Kentucky, it was the highest power capacity power plant in Kentucky. The plant currently has a capacity of 1.02-gigawatts (1,025 MW). The plant originally consisted of three coal units, with a combined capacity of 2,632 MW (2,379 MW net). Units 1 and 2 were retired in 2017, and replaced with the natural gas units, and Unit 3 was retired in 2020.

History
Paradise is located near the site of the former town of Paradise, Kentucky, on the Green River. Units 1 and 2, each with a capacity of 741 megawatts (704 MW net), began operation in 1963. Unit 3, with a capacity of 1,150 MW (971 MW net), began operations in 1970. Paradise contains three natural draft cooling towers, and was the only TVA fossil fuel plant with cooling towers.

The town was razed by the TVA in 1967 over concerns that ash and other plant emissions would damage residents' health. A barge unloading facility was constructed in 1985 so that coal could be delivered via barge, as well as by train and truck.

The Paradise's two original coal-fired generating units were shut down in favor of two natural gas plants that were brought online for commercial production April 7, 2017. The retirement of Units 1 and 2 reduced the coal consumption by nearly half in Muhlenberg County, Kentucky. According to the TVA, the authority made strides in cleaning up the emissions coming from their fossil fuel combustion facilities. Graphs and data from the TVA suggest that emissions in sulfur dioxide, nitrogen oxide, and carbon dioxide have dropped dramatically since the mid-1970s.

In August 2018, TVA began studying the possibility of closing the remaining unit at Paradise. A final environmental assessment prepared by the TVA concluded that the adverse environmental impacts of these fossil plants outweighed the need for them in this community; therefore it was necessary to close them. On February 14, 2019, the TVA board of directors voted 5-2 to shut down Paradise Unit 3 by December 2020, as well as Bull Run near Oak Ridge, Tennessee in 2023. High costs and low capacity factor were factors in their decision. This decision came following intense lobbying by the Trump Administration and Kentucky governor Matt Bevin to keep the plant open. Chief Executive, Bill Johnson, of the TVA said that the closing of Paradise and Bull Run's coal units will save consumers approximately $320 million. On February 1, 2020 the last coal-fired unit at Paradise Fossil Plant was shut down after 50 years of operation.

On November 10, 2022, the TVA demolished the cooling towers of all three retired coal-firing units by controlled implosion. TVA plans to install a solar power farm in place of the demolished cooling towers.

Cultural references
In 1971, singer/songwriter John Prine, whose father was from Paradise, released a recording of his song titled "Paradise". The song describes the former town of Paradise, Kentucky, which was destroyed when its former site was strip mined for coal.

See also

Coal mining in Kentucky
List of largest power stations in the United States

References

External links
 Official website – Fossil Plant
 Official website – Combined Cycle Plant

Energy infrastructure completed in 1963
Energy infrastructure completed in 1970
Energy infrastructure completed in 2017
Former coal-fired power stations in the United States
Natural gas-fired power stations in Kentucky
Buildings and structures in Muhlenberg County, Kentucky
Tennessee Valley Authority
1963 establishments in Kentucky